Teen Idol was written by Meg Cabot and published in July 2004 in hardcover edition and in August 2005 in paperback edition.

Plot
Jenny Greenley is a 16-year-old high school junior who lives in the small town of Clayton, Indiana. She is secretly the school newspaper's advice columnist Ask Annie, a job she got due to her ability to keep others' secrets and help people with their problems- something she been doing her entire life. Teen film star and heartthrob Luke Striker is making a movie about high school, but having grown up on television, he knows nothing about real teens and their lifestyles. When he decides to go undercover at Clayton High School to research his role, the principal assigns Luke as Jen's responsibility; she is expected to show him around the school, help him integrate, and most importantly, keep his true identity secret from her fellow students.

During his time at Clayton, Luke is appalled by the vicious hierarchy of high school and tells Jen that she should start taking a stand for the people who can't speak for themselves, rather than just consoling them and letting it happen again and again. After Luke's true identity is revealed at a school car wash, Jen realizes that she has the power to do so, and starts making serious changes in the lives of others and herself as well, morphing from "nice little Jenny Greenley, everybody's best friend" to Jen, effector of social change. She quits show choir, foils a cruel senior prank, and befriends unpopular outcast Cara. When she confronts her best friend Trina about her poor treatment of her boyfriend, Trina begins to get angry. Compounded by the discovery that Jen is going to the school's annual Spring Fling with Luke (who asked her as an apology for the trouble he caused), she is furious, and refuses to talk to her for several days. However, despite the newfound media exposure surrounding Clayton, Jen's feelings for Luke remain platonic. Meanwhile, she grows closer to Scott, a fellow junior and editor of the school newspaper. Trina eventually realizes that she has overreacted, and makes up with Jen.

At the Spring Fling, after Luke and Jen are crowned king and queen, Luke reveals that he is going out with Geri Lynn- a senior and friend of Jen's- and also tells Jen that he knows she is Annie, much to her surprise. He encourages Jen to follow her own advice and confess her true feelings for Scott, who is Geri's ex-boyfriend. Jen, Trina, and several classmates leave the dance and head over to a friend's anti-Spring Fling party where Scott is. Nervously, Jen agrees to take a walk with him, during which, after a heated discussion, he reveals that the only reason he has not told Jen about his true feelings sooner is because he thought she was in love with Luke. Scott and Jen finally admit their feelings for one another and share a kiss.

The novel ends with Luke and Geri together in LA, and Scott and Jen in a relationship as well. Jen, aided by Trina and Cara, is running for student body president next year, but half-jokingly notes that she "might be aiming a little too low. I'm thinking, a girl with my people skills? Well... why not the White House?"

Characters

Jenny "Jen" Greenley is a high school junior who is well liked by everyone, and tries to smooth things over all the time. She may be good at solving others' problems, but still needs help with solving her own. She also writes "Ask Annie", the school newspaper's advice column. In the story, it notes that Jen, including Scott, like "geeky" books. She eventually becomes Scott's girlfriend at an anti-spring fling party.

Scott Bennett is the editor of the school newspaper and a longtime friend of Jenny's who moved away in fifth grade, but returned last summer. Jenny mentions that he is a great cook, and he shares her passion for science fiction. He starts the novel in a relationship with Geri Lynn, but eventually becomes Jenny's boyfriend.

Luke Striker (alias Lucas Smith) is a hugely famous teen star who comes to Jenny's Indiana high school to research a role for his next film, while hiding his identity. He soon learns how vicious high school can be, and is the one who encourages Jenny to shake things up. He goes to the Spring Fling with her, but is later revealed to be in a relationship with Geri Lynn.

Catrina Larssen is Jen's best friend. A drama queen in all respects of the word, Catrina does not answer to her birth name and prefers to be called 'Trina' by her peers.  She is a superfan of Luke, which makes it harder for Jenny to keep his secret. She hints throughout the book that Jen and Scott are made for each other, a theory which turns out to be correct. She is also Steve's girlfriend.

Geri Lynn Packard is the only other senior girl on the paper, Scott's ex-girlfriend, and later Luke's new girlfriend. She is passionate about journalism and the rights of the media, and goes on to attend UCLA. Strangely, she only likes to drink flat soda.

Steve McKnight is Trina's boyfriend. He is madly in love with Trina and will do pretty much anything for her, including auditioning for school plays. He breaks up with her because of her obsession with Luke and her constantly taking advantage of him, but they later make up.

Cara Schlosberg is a tragically envious girl who wants nothing more than to be a member of the popular group at Clayton High. Often called 'Cara Cow' because of her slight obesity and the many "moo's" she gets when she walks by in the cafeteria, she is later reformed by Jen and eventually loses all desire to be popular. She also becomes Kwang's girlfriend.

Betty-Ann Mulvaney is a doll owned by Jen's Latin teacher, Mrs. Mulvaney. She is stolen by popular jock Kurt Schraeder, who swipes her from Mrs. Mulvaney's desk as the senior prank. Throughout the book, Jen makes several attempts to retrieve the doll, but doesn't succeed until she and Scott coerce Kurt's little sister Vicky into giving them the doll with a threat of blackmail.

Similarities to How to Be Popular (another novel by Meg Cabot)

This book has many similarities to another Meg Cabot book, How to Be Popular.
 Both take place in the state of Indiana (although the state of Indiana appears in assorted other Cabot books). 
 The main characters in both get together with longtime guy friends at the end.
 Both contain pages from a fictional publication between the chapters- Ask Annie advice columns in Teen Idol and pages from "How to Be Popular" in How to Be Popular. 
 Both mention Culver Military Academy.

References

2004 American novels
American young adult novels
Novels by Meg Cabot
Novels set in Indiana
HarperCollins books